Miga and Quatchi are the official mascots of the 2010 Winter Olympics, Sumi is the official mascot of the 2010 Winter Paralympics, and Mukmuk is their designated "sidekick" for both games, held in Vancouver, British Columbia, Canada. The four mascots were introduced on November 27, 2007. They were designed by the Canadian and American design studio, Meomi Design. It was the first time (since Cobi and Petra) that the Olympic and Paralympic mascots were introduced at the same time.

Development
The emblem of 2010 Winter Olympics, "Ilanaaq the Inukshuk", was picked through an open contest. However, it met criticism from some aboriginal groups over its design. So the mascot artist was selected through a competition.

Through the process where 177 professionals around the world were submitted their ideas, five were made final. In December 2006, VANOC eventually selected concepts from Meomi Design. Formed in 2002, Meomi is a group of Vicki Wong, a Vancouver-born Canadian of Chinese descent who worked in graphic and web design, and Michael Murphy, born in Milford, Michigan, who worked in design and motion graphics. Writing for Sports Illustrated, experts Michael Erdmann and John Ryan, while making comments on the mascots of the Olympic Games held in Canada, pointed out that Meomi's character drawing styles "are more closely related to Urban Vinyl [...]".

After the selection, Meomi provided more than 20 different concepts to VANOC, and three concepts were selected. The conception of the mascots were based on the local wildlife, as well as First Nations legends, mythologies and legendary creatures. During the design process, an early name for Quatchi was dismissed when the undisclosed word was found to have a rude connotation in another language. An animated video by Buck, a design studio based in New York and Los Angeles, with music provided by Kid Koala was screened on the first public presentation of the mascots. Details about mascots were kept secret until November 27, 2007 when they were unveiled to the public.

Mascots
The first public presentation of the mascots took place before 800 schoolchildren at the Bell Centre For Performing Arts in Surrey, British Columbia. This represents the first time that the Olympic and Paralympic mascots were introduced at the same time.

Miga and Quatchi are mascots for the 2010 Winter Olympics, while Sumi is the mascot for the 2010 Winter Paralympics. Aside of three mascots, Mukmuk is their designated "sidekick". Thus, there are two Olympic mascots and one Paralympic mascot as well as one "sidekick". They made a cameo appearance in Mario & Sonic at the Olympic Winter Games.

Reception

Popularity

Mukmuk, although a designated "sidekick", was a run-away success, "capturing the hearts of Games-goers everywhere"; including an impromptu "protest" at the Vancouver Art Gallery to make him a full-fledged mascot, and making "Top 5" for the Olympic games in the Vancouver edition of 24 Hours.

Criticism and image confusion
When the mascots were unveiled, there were initial concerns over whether they were effective at representing British Columbia and Canada.

On July 3, 2009, Canadian artist Michael R. Barrick created two composite images – one based on the official art, and the other based on a fan art created by Angela Melick – depicting the official mascots alongside Pedobear, an internet meme popularized by the imageboard 4chan. The images were created to make "a visual critique of how the style of the mascots resembles the style of Pedobear." As a result of the images receiving high rankings on Google Images, this image was mistakenly used by other media. The Polish newspaper Gazeta Olsztyńska used one of the images for a front-page story about the then-upcoming Olympics, published on February 4, 2010. Similarly, the Dutch television guide Avrobode used one of the images.

After the games
In compliance with the strict orders of the International Olympic Committee which require that the mascots must not be animated or be worn again so that the raw material cannot be reused, 48 of the 61 life-sized mascot costumes were destroyed. Three full sets of costumes are kept in Canada, one full set has gone to the IOC in Switzerland, and one Sumi costume has gone to the International Paralympic Committee in Germany.

See also

Chimera
Orca
Thunderbird (mythology)
American black bear
Bigfoot
Bigfoot in popular culture
Vancouver Island marmot
Olympic mascots
Paralympic mascots

References

External links
Official Mascots page 
Official Mascots Merchandise 
2010 Winter Olympics Press Release on the Mascots  (November 26, 2007)
Meomi Design - Designers of mascots
zinc Roe Design microsite of the mascots

2010 Winter Olympics
2010 Winter Paralympics
Olympic mascots
Paralympic mascots
Fictional hybrids
Bear mascots
Bigfoot in popular culture
Totem poles
Canadian mascots
Fictional characters with air or wind abilities
Fictional characters with water abilities
Fictional characters with superhuman strength
Fictional characters from British Columbia